Fan art or fanart is artwork created by fans of a work of fiction and derived from a series character or other aspect of that work. They are usually done by amateur artists, semi-professionals or professionals. As fan labor, fan art refers to artworks that are neither created nor (normally) commissioned or endorsed by the creators of the work from which the fan art derives.

A different, older meaning of the term is used in science fiction fandom, where fan art traditionally describes original (rather than derivative) artwork related to science fiction or fantasy, created by fan artists, and appearing in low- or non-paying publications such as semiprozines or fanzines, and in the art shows of science fiction conventions. The Hugo Award for Best Fan Artist has been given each year since 1967 for artists who create such works. Like the term fan fiction (although to a lesser extent), this traditional meaning is now sometimes confused with the more recent usage described above.

Forms
Fan art can take many forms. In addition to traditional paintings and drawings and digital art, fan artists may also create conceptual, sculpture, video art, livestreams, web banners, avatars, collages, graphic designs or web-based animations, as well as photo collages, posters, artistic representations of quotes from a work or artistic representations of characters in new contexts or in contexts that are in keeping with the original series.

The broad availability of digital image processing and the Internet, as well as text-to-image generators, has greatly increased the scope and potential reach of fan art. American TV producer Bryan Konietzko wrote in 2013:
"I remember back in the Avatar days [2005–2008]... the typical fanart we would get would be a charming, childish crayon drawing stuffed in an envelope. Nowadays on Korra [2012–2014], I take a skewed screenshot with my phone, post it, and shortly thereafter someone un-skews it, crops it, separates the character levels, clones the background, "Ken Burns" it with a multilevel slide, animates the characters blinking and talking, tints it, and makes a GIF out of it, that I then see on the same phone with which I took the original picture. Times they are a-changin'..."

Rule 34, the idea that everything is represented in internet pornography, commonly takes the form of erotic fan art. 

Fan art can also serve as cultural commentary or criticism, presenting established characters in new situations or contexts which would never appear in canon. This allows fans and artists to explore deeper or alternate meanings, as well as fan theories, about their favorite media.

Copyright

United States
The legal status of derivative fan made art in America may be tricky due to the vagaries of the United States Copyright Act. Generally, the right to reproduce and display pieces of artwork is controlled by the original author or artist under 17 U.S.C. § 106. Fan art using settings and characters from a previously created work could be considered a derivative work, which would place control of the copyright with the owner of that original work. Display and distribution of fan art that would be considered a derivative work would be unlawful.

However, American copyright law allows for the production, display and distribution of derivative works if they fall under a fair use exemption, 17 U.S.C. § 107. A court would look at all relevant facts and circumstances to determine whether a particular use qualifies as fair use; a multi-pronged rubric for this decision involves evaluating the amount and substantiality of the original appropriated, the transformative nature of the derivative work, whether the derivative work was done for educational or noncommercial use, and the economic effect that the derivative work imposes on the copyright holder's ability to make and exploit their own derivative works. None of these factors is alone dispositive.

American courts also typically grant broad protection to parody, and some fan art may fall into this category. This has not explicitly been adjudicated with respect to fan art, however. Moreover, while parody is typically afforded protection under § 107, a court must engage in a fact-intensive, case-specific inquiry for each work.

References

External links

 FanArt.TV – Fan art website with may different types of fan art for TV shows and music artists
 Game-Art-Hq.Com – Fan art website specialized on video game related fan art
 Fan Art  Documentary from the web series  Off Book
 DeviantArt – DeviantArt calls itself "the world's largest online social community for artists and art enthusiasts" and hosts many fan artists and their art.

Visual arts genres
Unofficial adaptations
Fan labor
Internet art
New media art
Digital art